Vengeance: A Love Story is a 2017 American action thriller film directed by Johnny Martin, written by John Mankiewicz, and starring Nicolas Cage, Don Johnson, Anna Hutchison, Talitha Bateman and Deborah Kara Unger. It is based on the 2003 novel Rape: A Love Story by Joyce Carol Oates. The film was released on September 15, 2017, by FilmRise.

Premise
A policeman investigating a single mother's rape soon takes matters into his own hands after the attackers are acquitted in court.

Cast

Nicolas Cage as John Dromoor
Anna Hutchison as Teena Maguire
Talitha Bateman as Bethie Maguire
Deborah Kara Unger as Agnes
Don Johnson as Jay Kirkpatrick
Joshua Mikel as Marvin Fick
Charlene Tilton as Mrs. Irma Fick
Dikran Tulaine as Mr. Walter Fick
Mike Pniewski as Judge Schpiro
Marc Coppola as Dr. Collins
Francois Xavier Declie as Father Muldoon
Michael Papajohn as JJ Breen
Jwaundace Candece as Night Nurse 
Elizabeth Hunter as Annie
Dwayne Boyd as Det. Lyle
Emily Sandifer as Ursula
Rey Herrnandez as Trooper #1 (Craig)

Production
Originally, production with Samuel L. Jackson, Dianne Wiest and Abigail Breslin associated, was set to be filmed in Michigan in 2009, under its film incentive program. Scouts arrived in fall 2008 and production was halted.
On February 7, 2016, Nicolas Cage joined the cast of the film. On March 8, it was announced that Cage would direct the film, though he later dropped out of directing. Principal photography began on April 21. The following day, Anna Hutchison joined the cast. On May 12, Don Johnson joined the cast.

Release
The film was released direct to video in the United Kingdom on March 27, 2017. In the United States, the film was released on September 15, 2017, by FilmRise. Michael Rechtshaffen of the Los Angeles Times was negative towards the film, criticizing the script as "melodramatic" and "ham-handed," the directing as "heavy-handed" and "cliché-ridden," and Cage's performance of John Dromoor as "detached."

References

External links
 
 

2017 films
2017 action thriller films
American vigilante films
American action thriller films
Films about police officers
Films about rape
Films based on American novels
Films scored by Frederik Wiedmann
Films set in New York (state)
Independence Day (United States) films
2010s English-language films
2010s American films